The Tsyklon-3, also known as Tsiklon-3 and Cyclone-3 (known as SL-14 by the United States DoD), GRAU index 11K68, was a Soviet, and subsequently Ukrainian orbital carrier rocket. Tsyklon 3 rocket body debris accounts for more than 500 pieces of space debris.

Overview

A derivative of the R-36 ICBM, and a member of the Tsyklon family, Tsyklon-3 made its maiden flight on 24 June 1977, and was retired on 30 January 2009. The Ukrainian-built Tsyklon rockets were retired in favour of future all-Russian carrier rockets, such as the Angara, and because they were fuelled by toxic hypergolic propellants.

Successor
Ukraine was developing a commercial derivative of the Tsyklon-3, the Tsyklon-4. The development of Tsyklon-4 ended in 2015 after Ukraine's development partner Brazil pulled out of the project. Tsyklon-4 never made it to launch pad.

Another successor to the Tsyklon rockets, Cyclone-4M (based on Tsyklon-4 designs), is under development as of 2021 for use in the commercial market.

Debris

2013 loss of Ecuadorian satellite after impact with Tsyklon-3 space debris 
On 23 May 2013 at approximately 05:38 UTC, the Ecuadorian satellite NEE-01 Pegaso passed very close to the spent upper stage of a 1985 Tsyklon-3 rocket over the Indian Ocean. While there was no direct collision between the satellite and upper stage, Pegaso is believed to have suffered a "glancing blow" after passing through a debris cloud around the Tsyklon stage and striking one of the small pieces. After the incident, the satellite was found to be "spinning wildly over two of its axes" and unable to communicate with its ground station. 
Efforts to reestablish control of Pegaso failed, 
and on 28 August 2013 the decision was made by EXA and the Ecuadorian government to declare the satellite lost.

Other Debris events
The Tsyklon-3 rocket body used to launch the Meteor 2-16  on August 18, 1987 has fragmented five times between 1988 and 2006 due in part to propellant left inside the vehicle, resulting in more than 100 pieces of debris many of which are still in orbit.

See also
Angara rocket
Dnepr rocket
Tsyklon
Tsyklon-2
Tsyklon-4
Cyclone-4M

External links
Encyclopedia Astronautica- Tsiklon 3

References

Yuzhmash space launch vehicles
2009 in spaceflight
Space launch vehicles of the Soviet Union
Space launch vehicles of Ukraine
Derelict satellites orbiting Earth
Spacecraft that broke apart in space